Tiquicia a genus in the family Syrphidae ("syrphid flies"). It was previously considered to be a subgenus of Allograpta.

Species
Tiquicia nishida Mengual & Thompson, 2009
Tiquicia zumbadoi Thompson, 2000

References

Syrphini
Hoverfly genera